Released in 2004, Violent Silences is the second studio release of Scottish industrial rock artist Rico and the follow-up to the critically acclaimed Sanctuary Medicines.  It is the first album released by Rico under his own label, Manufractured Records.

Themes
Violent Silences theme seems to be a hit out at controlling record studios who place profit before the interests of signed artists.  From the album's cover art - a gagged Rico next to a large and prominent bar code - to the lyrical content of the song "Manufractured", which openly criticises the perceived hypocrisy and purely fiscal motivations of record company executives.

The album also touches on the related subjects of manufactured chart music (in "Dawn Raid") and on advertising in general (in "Recommended Dose").

As well as addressing themes that appear to be close to the artist's heart, Violent Silences includes an electro-rock cover of the Talking Heads classic Psycho Killer and a collaboration with electronic-music legend Gary Numan, entitled "Crazier".

In the album's cover notes, Rico has this to say about the album:
"This album has been a trouble project since the very start.  I've been in and out of management deals, been close to becoming an alcoholic and spent long periods in utter mental chaos.  In many ways I'm surprised to have come out the other side in one piece."

Track listing

2004 albums